European No-Gi Brazilian Jiu-Jitsu Championship is a No-Gi Brazilian Jiu-Jitsu (BJJ) tournament hosted annually by the International Brazilian Jiu-Jitsu Federation.  It was first held in 2012 in London, England and has been held subsequently each year in Rome, Italy.

List of European No-Gi Brazilian Jiu-Jitsu Champions Male division, by Year and Weight

List of European No-Gi Brazilian Jiu-Jitsu Champions Female division, by Year and Weight

See also 
 IBJJF
 World Championship
 World No-Gi Championship
 Pan Jiu-Jitsu Championship
 Pan Jiu-Jitsu No-Gi Championship
 European Open Championship
 Brazilian National Jiu-Jitsu Championship
 Brazilian Nationals Jiu-Jitsu No-Gi Championship
 Asian Open Championship
 Abu Dhabi Combat Club Submission Wrestling World Championship

References

External links 
 IBBJJF

European Championship
No-Gi Brazilian jiu-jitsu competitions